Auricularia mesenterica, commonly known as the tripe fungus, is a species of fungus in the family Auriculariaceae. Basidiocarps (fruit bodies) grow in undulating densely-packed shelves that adopt a partially resupinate form. A. mesenterica feeds saprotrophically on a number of woody substrates in deciduous forests.

Taxonomy and etymology 
Auricularia mesenterica was described by James Dickson as Helvella mesenterica in 1785, and transferred to the genus Auricularia by Christiaan Hendrik Persoon in 1822. Further genetic analysis has revealed an Auricularia mesenterica species complex, with A. mesenterica as the basal species.

Description 
The upper surface is gray to brown, tomentose to hispid with concentric zones, while the underside is thickly gelatinous, irregularly folded radially, wavy and putty-like, and reddish-brown. The spore print is white.

Distribution and habitat 
This species is considered a cosmopolitan species and grows on many different species of angiosperm wood, such as poplar, elm, and ash, typically in summer to fall. It is a common species in Europe, but rare in the Americas and China.

Uses 

Before the fruit body fully matures and hardens, young specimens are edible, but in some local populations, these fungi tend to bioaccumulate high levels of heavy metals from their environment. A. mesenterica has shown to have high levels of phenols, flavonoids, and antioxidant activity, having potential as antitumor agent.

References 

Auriculariales
Taxa named by James Dickson (botanist)
Fungi described in 1785
Fungi of Europe